Listed below are the worst disasters in Poland's history, listed by death toll. This list excludes warfare, the Holocaust and intentional acts of destruction, but may include accidents in which the military, Polish or foreign, was involved (e.g. Osiecznica bus disaster - a collision between a Polish bus and a Soviet Army's truck).

Some of the disasters listed here occurred outside of current Polish borders (e.g. the Smolensk Tu-154 crash) or in times when Poland was not internationally recognized (e.g. during the partitions of Poland), but the predominant number of victims were either Poles or Polish citizens.

Over 100 confirmed deaths 
 LOT Polish Airlines Flight 5055, 1987 (9 May), Warsaw, 183 killed
 Kleofas coal mine disaster, 1896, Katowice (then German Empire), 104 killed
 "Barbara-Wyzwolenie" coal mine disaster, 1954 (21 March), Chorzów, 103 killed

40 to 99 confirmed deaths 
 Smolensk Tu-154 crash, 2010 (10 April), Smolensk, (Russia), 96 killed, including Polish president Lech Kaczyński, his wife and other political and military officials.
 LOT Polish Airlines Flight 007, 1980 (14 March), Warsaw, 87 killed
 "Makoszowy" coal mine disaster, 1958 (28 August), Zabrze, 72 killed
 Otłoczyn railway accident, 1980 (19 August), near Brzoza Toruńska, 67 killed
 Katowice Trade Hall roof collapse, 2006 (28 January), Chorzów, 65 killed
 1928 Poland Derecho, 1928, (4 July), 62 killed 
 Outdoor Cinema fire, 1955 (11 May), Wielopole Skrzyńskie, 58 killed
 1997 Central European flood, 1997 (July), western Poland, 56 killed
 Górna Grupa mental hospital fire, 1980 (31 October - 1 November), Górna Grupa, 55 killed
 MS Jan Heweliusz, 1993 (14 January), Baltic Sea (near Rügen Island), 55 killed
 LOT Polish Airlines Flight 165, 1969 (2 April), Polica (near Zawoja), 53 killed
 Rotunda PKO Bank explosion, 1979 (15 February), Warsaw, 49 killed

20 to 39 confirmed deaths 
 1978 Balkan Bulgarian Tupolev Tu-134 crash, 1978 (16 March), Gabare (Bulgaria), 39 Poles killed (out of 73 total fatalities)
 Czechowice-Dziedzice Refinery fire, 1971 (26–27 June), Czechowice-Dziedzice, 37 killed
 1962 LOT Vickers Viscount Warsaw crash, 1962 (19 December), Warsaw, 33 killed
 PKS Gdańsk bus crash, 1994 (2 May), Gdańsk-Kokoszki, 32 killed
 Wilczy Jar buses tragedy, 1978 (15 November), Wilczy Jar (n. Żywiec-Oczków), 30 killed
 Warsaw Holy Cross Church Stampede, 1881 (25 December), Warsaw, 30 killed
 Grenoble coach crash, 2007 (22 July), Vizille (France), 27 killed
 Julianka rail crash, 1976 (3 November), Julianka (n. Częstochowa), 25 killed
 Osieck rail crash, 1981 (4 June), Osieck, 25 killed
 MS Busko Zdrój, 1985 (8 February), North Sea, 24 killed
 Kamień Pomorski homeless hostel fire, 2009 (13 April), Kamień Pomorski, 23 killed
 Halemba coal mine disaster, 2006, 2006 (22 November), Ruda Śląska, 23 killed
 MS Maria Konopnicka fire in Stocznia Gdańska, 1961 (13 December), 23 killed
 Wojska Polskiego 39 Street gas explosion, 1995 (17 April), Gdańsk, 22 killed
 Mirosławiec air accident crash, 2008 (23 January), Mirosławiec, 20 killed
 MS Kudowa Zdrój, 1983 (20 January), Mediterranean, 20 killed
 Wujek-Śląsk coal mine disaster, 18 September 2009, Ruda Śląska – a methane explosion killed 12 in the coal mine and a further 8 would die in hospital

15 to 19 confirmed deaths 
 Balaton coach crash, 2002 (1 July), n. Balaton (Hungary), 19 killed
 Halemba coal mine disaster, 1990 (10 January), Ruda Śląska, 19 killed
 Biały Jar avalanche, 1968 (20 March), valley on Sněžka mountain (n. Karpacz), 19 killed
 Nowe Miasto nad Pilica bus crash, 2010 (12 October), Nowe Miasto nad Pilica, 18 killed
 "Mysłowice" coal mine disaster, 1987 (4 February), Mysłowice, 18 killed
 B406/6 trawler explosion in Stocznia Gdańska, 1980 (18 June), Gdańsk, 18 killed
 Motława, 1975 (1 August), Gdańsk, 18 killed
 M/v "Nysa", 1965 (10 January), North Sea, 18 killed
 Polish Air Force An-24 crash, 1973 (28 February), Szczecin airport 18 killed
 Struga 12 street gas explosion, 1976 (1 February), Gdańsk, 17 killed
 Szczekociny rail crash, 2012 (3 March), Szczekociny, killed 16
 Ursus rail crash, 1990 (20 August), Ursus (n. Warsaw), 16 killed
 Radkowice rail crash, 1973 (27 August), Radkowice, 16 killed
 Osiecznica bus crash, 1978 (22 January), n. Osiecznica, 15 killed
 Wyszaka streetcar crash, 1967 (7 December), Szczecin, 15 killed

10 to 14 confirmed deaths 
 Brandenburg coach crash, 2010, (26 September), Schönefeld (Germany), 14 killed
 "Kaskada" restaurant fire, 1981 (27 April), Szczecin, 14 killed
 MS Czubatka, 1955 (10 May), North Sea, 14 killed
 Krosno Odrzańskie tornado, 1886 (13 May), Krosno Odrzańskie, 13 killed 
 Izbicko level crossing accident, 1960, (6 January), Izbicko, 13 killed
 Storm in Mazury, 2007 (21 August), Mazury (north-eastern Poland), 12 killed
 Jeżewo coach crash, 2005 (30 September), Sikory-Wojciechowięta (n. Stare Jeżewo), 12 killed
 Reptowo rail crash, 1997 (5 May), Reptowo (n. Szczecin), 12 killed
 Bydgoszcz rail crash, 1972 (3 June), Śliesin (n. Bydgoszcz), 12 killed
 MS Cyranka, 1956 (4 October), North Sea, 12 killed
 ČSM-north coal mine disaster, 2018 (20 December), Stonava (n. Karviná), Czechia, 12 killed
 Psie Pole rail crash, 1977 (9 July), Mirków (n. Wrocław), 11 killed (unofficial - 32 killed)
 "Jas-Mos" coal mine disaster, 2002 (10 February), 10 killed
 Ministry of Interior MSWiA helicopter crash, 1991 (10 January), n. Cisna, 10 killed
 Drogomil level crossing accident, 1988 (4 June), Drogomil (n. Bytom Odrzański), 10 killed
 Piła rail crash, 1988 (19 May), Piła, 10 killed
 MS Brda, 1975 (10 January), Hanstholm (Denmark), 10 killed
 "Rokitnica" coal mine disaster, 1971 (23 March), Zabrze, 10 killed
 Agricultural University building collapse, 1966 (22 March), Wrocław, 10 killed

Fewer than 10 confirmed deaths 
 Bratoszewice level crossing collision, 30 July 2012, 9 killed 
 1983 Łódź gas explosion, 7 December 1983, 8 killed
 2017 Świebodzice tenement collapse, 8 April 2017, 6 killed
 2019 Koszalin Escape Room Fire, 4 January, 2019, 5 killed
 2008 Poland tornado outbreak, 15-16 August 2008, 4 killed
 2022 missile explosion in Poland, 15 November 2022, 2 killed
 2020 Warsaw bus crash 25 June 2020, 1 killed

See also
 List of disasters in Antarctica by death toll
 List of disasters in Australia by death toll
 List of disasters in Canada by death toll
 List of disasters in Croatia by death toll
 List of disasters in Great Britain and Ireland by death toll
 List of disasters in New Zealand by death toll
 List of disasters in the United States by death toll

References

Disasters in Poland
Poland
 
Lists of events in Poland